David Read Evans (February 20, 1769March 8, 1843) was a U.S. Representative from South Carolina.

Born in Westminster, England, Evans immigrated to the United States in 1784 with his father, who settled in South Carolina.
He attended Mount Zion College.
He studied law.
He was admitted to the bar in 1796 and commenced practice in Winnsboro.
He served as member of the State house of representatives 1802–1805.
He served as solicitor of the middle judicial circuit 1804–1811.

Evans was elected as a Democratic-Republican to the Thirteenth Congress (March 4, 1813 – March 3, 1815).
He declined to be a candidate for reelection and returned to his plantation.
He served as member of the State senate 1824–1832.
He was the first president of the Fairfield Bible Society.
He died in Winnsboro, South Carolina, March 8, 1843.
He was interred at a private residence in Winnsboro. Place of interment is now the Bethel A.R.P Cemetery located on North Vanderhorst Street, Winnsboro, SC.

Sources

1769 births
1843 deaths
Democratic-Republican Party members of the United States House of Representatives from South Carolina
People from Westminster
English emigrants to the United States
Burials in South Carolina